Gib Heath (historically Gibb Heath or Gibheath) is a small area of Birmingham, England. It is an inner-city area generally considered to be a part of Handsworth.

References 

Areas of Birmingham, West Midlands